Kimberley Anne Woltemas Tiamsiri (born January 22, 1992) is a Thai actress and model. She made her breakthrough in acting career after she played the role of Nam in the series 4 Huajai Haeng Koon Kao (4 Hearts of the Mountains) for the first part of the series, Thara Himalaya, where she was paired up with Atichart Chumnanon.

Early life and education
Her mother is Thai, coming from from Chiang Mai, while her father is of German and Spanish origin with a Ph.D in Law from Harvard University. She has 2 older brothers and 1 older sister: Thomas, Daniel and Jennifer.

Personal life
On April 17, 2022, Kimberley Anne Woltemas and her boyfriend of eight years, Prin Suparat, got engaged.

Filmography

Drama

Discography

Awards and nominations

External links

References

1992 births
Living people
Kimberley Anne Woltemas
Kimberley Anne Woltemas
Kimberley Anne Woltemas
Kimberley Anne Woltemas
Kimberley Anne Woltemas
Kimberley Anne Woltemas